Maurice Gambier d'Hurigny (1912 - 2000) was a French sculptor. He graduated from the École des Beaux-Arts. He won the Prix de Rome in Sculpture for La jeune Eve apparaît à l'aurore première in 1942. He also designed public sculptures, like the bust of François-René de Chateaubriand on the Square des Missions-Étrangères in the 7th arrondissement of Paris.

References

1912 births
2000 deaths
École des Beaux-Arts alumni
French male sculptors
20th-century French sculptors
Prix de Rome winners